Over 60 Minutes With... is the seventh album release by Canadian hard rock/heavy metal band Helix. Their first compilation, it collects music from their first three Capitol Records albums but includes nothing from Wild in the Streets (1987). It was released on cassette and CD. Along with past singles and album tracks, the compilation album also includes previously unreleased songs "Everybody Pays the Price" and "Give It To You". Also included is "Jaws of the Tiger", which had first been released in 1986 as the B-side of the "It's Too Late" single.

"Give It to You" was later re-recorded and re-released on Back for Another Taste (1990). "Jaws of the Tiger" was re-recorded and re-released on B-sides (1999). "Everybody Pays the Price" was never re-recorded, but it was re-released as the B-side to the single "The Storm", and also on the Helix compilation Deep Cuts: The Best Of.

Track list 
No Rest for the Wicked
Check Out the Love
Dirty Dog
Give It to You
Young & Wreckless
Deep Cuts the Knife
Animal House
You Keep Me Rockin'
Never Want to Lose You
Does a Fool Ever Learn
Jaws of the Tiger
White Lace and Black Leather
Long Way to Heaven
Without You (Jasmine's Song)
Everybody Pays the Price
Heavy Metal Love
Gimme Gimme Good Lovin'
When the Hammer Falls
The Kids Are All Shakin'
(Make Me Do) Anything You Want
Rock You

Personnel 
Brian Vollmer – lead vocals
Brent "The Doctor" Doerner – guitars
Paul Hackman – guitars
Greg "Fritz" Hinz – drums
Daryl Gray – bass
Mike Uzelac – bass on tracks 1, 2, 3, 9, 10, 12, and 16

References 

Helix (band) albums
1989 compilation albums
Capitol Records compilation albums